Shamur is a music group formed by Italian producers Emanuele Marascia and Sandro Murru. Shamur are signed to an exclusive multi-album worldwide deal with DSE Records, and Universal Music Group in the UK.

Their music features a combination of Eastern atmospheres and the classic European style, with Teresa Solinas and an undisclosed man of Punjabi origin as lead singers. Shamur obtained success in Greece in summer 2005, when they reached the top position on the music charts.

Shamur's debut song was "Let the Music Play", released in 2004, followed by "Gonna Make It". 

"Let the Music Play" was remade and released in 2021 by Sachin–Jigar for the film 'Roohi'. The re-released version of the song reached #2 on the UK Asian Music Charts.

References

External links
Official website of DSE Records
Discogs page

Italian pop music groups